Indonesia competed at the 2012 Asian Beach Games held in Haiyang, China from June 16 to 22, 2012.

Indonesia sent 106 athletes which competed in 8 sports.

Medals

Medal table

References 

Nations at the 2012 Asian Beach Games
2010
Asian Beach Games